Ben Millar McKendry (born March 25, 1993) is a Canadian professional soccer player who plays as a midfielder.

Club career

Early career
McKendry played club soccer for the Vancouver Selects and was also a member of the Vancouver Whitecaps FC Residency program before spending his college career at the University of New Mexico.  He made a total of 60 appearances for the Lobos and tallied 14 goals and five assists. In 2014, the Lobos went to the College Cup ("Final 4") after McKendry scored the winner against the University of Washington in the "Elite 8".

He also played in the Premier Development League for Vancouver Whitecaps FC U-23.

Vancouver Whitecaps FC
On January 26, 2015, McKendry signed a homegrown contract with Vancouver Whitecaps FC.  On March 29, he made his professional debut for USL affiliate club Whitecaps FC 2 in a 4–0 defeat to Seattle Sounders FC 2. McKendry made his Whitecaps first team debut on June 1, 2016 during the 2016 Canadian Championship. He got his first start in the MLS on March 11, 2017 in 3–2 loss to the San Jose Earthquakes. On July 26, 2017 he was loaned to FC Edmonton for the remainder of 2017. At the end of the 2017 season, the Whitecaps announced they would not pick up McKendry's contract, ending his time with the club.

Turun Palloseura (TPS)
On March 19, 2018, McKendry signed with newly promoted Finnish Premier Division (Veikkausliiga) side TPS. McKendry would make 29 appearances for TPS in the 2018 season.

Nyköpings BIS
After TPS was relegated to the Ykkönen, McKendry would sign with Nyköpings BIS of Division 1 Norra for the 2019 season.

Atlético Ottawa
On August 10, 2020, McKendry signed with Canadian Premier League side Atlético Ottawa making his debut in the club's inaugural match on August 15 against York9 and later re-signed with them for the 2021 season. He scored his first goal for Ottawa on October 13, 2021, netting the third goal in a 4–3 victory over FC Edmonton. In January 2022 Ottawa announced that McKendry had signed a one-year contract extension.

International career
McKendry was born in Canada, but holds dual-citizenship with New Zealand. McKendry was a member of the Canadian under-20 squad that competed in the 2013 CONCACAF U-20 Championship. In May 2016, McKendry was called to Canada's U23 national team for a pair of friendlies against Guyana and Grenada. He scored in the match against Grenada. McKendry made his Canada Men's National Team debut in a friendly against Bermuda in January 2017.

Honours

Atlético Ottawa 
 Canadian Premier League
Regular Season: 2022

Career statistics

References

External links

New Mexico Lobos bio

1993 births
Living people
Canadian people of New Zealand descent
Canadian soccer players
Canada men's international soccer players
Canada men's youth international soccer players
Canadian expatriate soccer players
New Mexico Lobos men's soccer players
Vancouver Whitecaps FC U-23 players
Vancouver Whitecaps FC players
Whitecaps FC 2 players
FC Edmonton players
Nyköpings BIS players
Atlético Ottawa players
Association football midfielders
Soccer players from Vancouver
Expatriate soccer players in the United States
Expatriate footballers in Finland
Expatriate footballers in Sweden
USL League Two players
USL Championship players
Major League Soccer players
Veikkausliiga players
Ettan Fotboll players
North American Soccer League players
Canadian Premier League players
Homegrown Players (MLS)
Canadian expatriate sportspeople in the United States
Canadian expatriate sportspeople in Finland
Canadian expatriate sportspeople in Sweden